Filloreta Raçi (born 31 March 1994), known professionally as Fifi, is a Kosovo-Albanian singer and songwriter.

Life and career

1994–2021: Early life and formations 

Fifi was born as Filloreta Raçi on 31 March 1994 in Herten, Germany, into an Albanian family from Ferizaj, Kosovo. Raised in Germany, she became interested in literature and theatre as well as music and attended the music school of Pristina. Forming her early forays into the music industry, Raçi participated in various music and talent competitions, including at Albanians Got Talent, The Voice of Albania and Top Fest. Adopting the stage name Fifi, she debuted with the single "FrymomMu" in 2015. In March 2021, Televizioni Klan (TV Klan) announced Raçi along Albanian singer Bruno as one of the contestants selected to compete in the 22nd edition of Kënga Magjike, marking her fourth consecutive participation at the competition. The singer also appeared on the first season of Albanian reality show Big Brother VIP in the span from October to November 2021.

2022–present: Upcoming album and continued success 

The lead single, "Vëmendje", from her upcoming debut album was released in November 2022.

Discography

Singles

As lead artist

Songwriter credits

References 

1994 births
21st-century Albanian women singers
Albanian emigrants to Germany
Albanian songwriters
Festivali i Këngës contestants
Kosovan emigrants to Germany
Kosovan people of Albanian descent
Kosovan singers
Living people
People from Ferizaj